The Chams are an ethnic group of Southeast Asia.

Chams may also refer to:
 Cham Albanians, an Albanian subgroup formerly residing in Greece
 Chaams (born 1970), Indian actor
 Gustavo Chams (born 1994), Brazilian photographer
 Milan Chams (born 1980), Nepalese director

See also 
 Cham (disambiguation)
 Shams (disambiguation)